A whipper is an especially hard or dynamic fall in rock climbing where the rope is weighed by a significant load.

Whipper may also refer to:

 Bob "Whipper" Watson (born 1970), Canadian lacrosse player
 Chris "Whipper" Layton, American drummer
 Prince Whipper Whip (21st century), Puerto Rican rapper
 Whipper Billy Watson (1915-1990), Canadian professional wrestler
 Whipper (budgerigar) (21st century), Famous mutant bird of New Zealand

People with the surname
 William Whipper (1804-1876), African American abolitionist and businessman

See also

 Whip (disambiguation)
 Whipped (disambiguation)